The Royal Spanish Athletics Federation (Spanish: Real Federación Española de Atletismo, RFEA), is the governing body for the sport of athletics in Spain. As of 2020, the federation has 1,411 registered clubs and 89,470 federated athlets.

History

If his first attempt to organize Interfédérale can be made back to 1917, when the first championships were held in Spain, it was not until March 27, 1920 that meet in Bilbao a meeting with Spanish Athletics Federation for to create a Federación Atlética Española: an interim board was established, chaired by Mr. Laffitte.

Kit suppliers
Spain's kits are supplied by Joma.

See also
Spanish records in athletics

References

External links
  Official site

Spain
Athletics
Athletics in Spain
National governing bodies for athletics
Organisations based in Spain with royal patronage
Sports organizations established in 1920